Prestoea tenuiramosa, the Guyana manicole palm or manacachilla, is a species of flowering plant in the family Arecaceae.
It is found in Brazil, Guyana, and Venezuela.

References

tenuiramosa
Flora of Brazil
Flora of Guyana
Flora of Venezuela
Near threatened plants
Taxonomy articles created by Polbot
Taxa named by Carl Lebrecht Udo Dammer